Air Malta serves the following 23 year-round and seasonal destinations as of January 2023 from its hub at Malta International Airport:

Destinations

References

Lists of airline destinations
Destinations